The 73rd edition of the KNVB Cup started on 13 October 1990. The final was played on 2 June 1991: Feyenoord beat BVV Den Bosch 1–0 and won the cup for the seventh time.

Teams
 All 18 participants of the Eredivisie 1990-91, eleven of which entering in the second round
 All 20 participants of the Eerste Divisie 1990-91
 28 teams from lower (amateur) leagues
 One youth team

First round
The matches of the first round were played on 13 and 14 October 1990.

E Eredivisie; 1 Eerste Divisie; A Amateur teams

Intermediary Round
There was only room for 32 teams in the next round, so this intermediary round was held on 14 November 1990.

Second round
The matches of the second round were played on 14, 15 and 16 December 1990. The eleven highest ranked Eredivisie teams from last season entered the tournament this round.

E eleven Eredivisie entrants

Round of 16
The matches of the round of 16 were played on 23 January 1991.

Quarter finals
The quarter finals were played on 27 February 1991.

Semi-finals
The semi-finals were played on 27 March and 11 April 1991.

Final

Feyenoord would participate in the Cup Winners' Cup.

See also
Eredivisie 1990-91
Eerste Divisie 1990-91

External links
 Netherlands Cup Full Results 1970–1994 by the RSSSF
 Results by Ronald Zwiers  

1990-91
1990–91 domestic association football cups
1990–91 in Dutch football